Smithfield Bus & Coach Works was an Australian bus bodybuilder in Smithfield, Sydney.

History
Smithfield Bus & Coach Works was formed when Westbus proprietors Bob and John Bosnjak purchased the bus bodying designs and jigs of Commonwealth Engineering in 1971.

As well as buses for private operators, Smithfield bodied these buses for government operators:
312 Leyland Leopards for the Public Transport Commission
22 AEC Swift 505s for ACTION
74 Volvo B58s for ACTION
16 MAN SL200s for ACTION
1 MAN SG192 for ACTION
33 Volvo B58s for Metro Tasmania

In May 1981 Smithfield Bus & Coach Works was sold to Custom Coaches.

References

External links
Bus Australia gallery

Bus manufacturers of Australia
1971 establishments in Australia
1981 disestablishments in Australia